Devasena is the name of a Hindu goddess.
Devasena may also refer to:
Devasena (character)
 Devasena (Jain monk)
 Devasena (Vakataka king)